John J. Mullen was an American football coach.  He served as the head football coach at Fordham University for one season in 1899. He compiled a record of 3–1.

Head coaching record

References

Year of birth missing
Year of death missing
Fordham Rams football coaches
Fordham Rams football players